William H. Lee House, also known as Billy Lee Farm, is a historic home located at Lewiston, Bertie County, North Carolina. It was built about 1820, and is a two-story, three bay, hall and parlor plan frame Federal style I-house. It has a side gable roof and rests on a brick pier foundation.

It was added to the National Register of Historic Places in 2012.

References

Houses on the National Register of Historic Places in North Carolina
Federal architecture in North Carolina
Houses completed in 1820
Houses in Bertie County, North Carolina
National Register of Historic Places in Bertie County, North Carolina